Morand is a French surname.

List of people with the surname 

 Charles Antoine Morand (1771–1835), Napoleonic general
 Maxine Morand (born 1959), Australian politician
 Paul Morand (1888–1976), French writer
 Sandrine Morand (born 1979), French curler

See also 

 Moran (surname)

Surnames
Surnames of French origin
French-language surnames